Frederick Fisher (29 January 1910 – 1955) was an English professional footballer who played as an inside forward in the Football League for Clapton Orient, Gillingham, Mansfield Town, Notts County, Swindon Town and Torquay United.

Career statistics

References

1910 births
English footballers
English Football League players
Newark Town F.C. players
Notts County F.C. players
Torquay United F.C. players
Mansfield Town F.C. players
Swindon Town F.C. players
Leyton Orient F.C. players
Newport (IOW) F.C. players
Gillingham F.C. players
Staveley Town F.C. players
Dudley Town F.C. players
1955 deaths
Association football inside forwards
People from Hucknall
Footballers from Nottinghamshire